Seefeld is a municipality  in the district of Starnberg in Bavaria, Germany.  The town lies on the western shore of the Pilsensee ("Pilsen Lake").  It is connected to the Bavarian capital city of Munich by the S-Bahn line S8.  Seefeld is notable for the Seefeld Castle (c. 1302), a seat of the Toering noble family of Bavaria.

References

Starnberg (district)